St. Casimir the Prince Church, Września - bricked church in the southern part of Września, located on Sławno district, on Słupska street.

Września
Wrzesnia, St. Casimir the Prince Church